Difemerine is a little known antimuscarinic drug sold under the name Luostyl.

References

Dimethylamino compounds
Tertiary alcohols
Carboxylate esters
Muscarinic antagonists